896 Sphinx  is a background asteroid from the inner regions of the asteroid belt, that measures approximately  in diameter. It was discovered on 1 August 1918, by astronomer Max Wolf at the Heidelberg-Königstuhl State Observatory in southwest Germany. The asteroid has a rotation period of 21.0 hours and is one of few low-numbered objects for which no spectral type has been determined. It was named after the Sphinx, a creature from Greek and Egyptian mythology.

Orbit and classification 

Sphinx is a non-family asteroid of the main belt's background population when applying the hierarchical clustering method to its proper orbital elements. It orbits the Sun in the inner asteroid belt at a distance of 1.9–2.7 AU once every 3 years and 6 months (1,262 days; semi-major axis of 2.29 AU). Its orbit has an eccentricity of 0.16 and an inclination of 8° with respect to the ecliptic. The body's observation arc begins at Heidelberg Observatory on 9 October 1918, two months after its official discovery observation.

Naming 

This minor planet was named after the Sphinx, a legendary creature from Greek and Egyptian mythology. The female monster has the head of a woman, the haunches of a lion, and the wings of a bird. It has the habit of killing anyone who cannot answer her riddle. The  was mentioned in The Names of the Minor Planets by Paul Herget in 1955.

Physical characteristics 

Contrary to most other low-numbered asteroids, no spectral type has been determined. Based on its relatively high albedo (see below) and its location within the inner parts of the main-belt, Sphinx may possibly be a common, stony S-type asteroid.

Rotation period 

In June 2018, a rotational lightcurve of Sphinx was obtained from photometric observations by Tom Polakis at the Command Module Observatory  in Arizona. Lightcurve analysis gave a rotation period of  hours with a brightness variation of  magnitude. However, an alternative period solution of  hours with an amplitude of  magnitude is also possible. Both results supersede a tentative period determination by Laurent Bernasconi from September 2001.

A modeled lightcurve using photometric data from the Lowell Photometric Database and from the Wide-field Infrared Survey Explorer (WISE) was published in 2018. It gave a divergent sidereal period of  hours and includes two spin axes at (172.0°, 20.0°) and (352.0°, 42.0°) in ecliptic coordinates (λ, β).

Diameter and albedo 

The Collaborative Asteroid Lightcurve Link derives an albedo of 0.2332 and a diameter of 13.17 kilometers based on an absolute magnitude of 11.6.

References

External links 
 Lightcurve Database Query (LCDB), at www.minorplanet.info
 Dictionary of Minor Planet Names, Google books
 Asteroids and comets rotation curves, CdR – Geneva Observatory, Raoul Behrend
 Discovery Circumstances: Numbered Minor Planets (1)-(5000) – Minor Planet Center
 
 

000896
Discoveries by Max Wolf
Named minor planets
19180801
Sphinxes